INAC may refer to:
 Indigenous and Northern Affairs Canada, a department of the Government of Canada (formerly Indian and Northern Affairs Canada and Aboriginal Affairs and Northern Development Canada)
 Instituto Nacional de Aviación Civil, the Argentine aviation institution
 National Institute of Civil Aviation (Instituto Nacional de Aeronáutica Civil), the former Venezuelan civil aviation agency
 Nicaraguan Civil Aeronautics Institute (Instituto Nicaragüense de Aeronáutica Civil), the Nicaraguan civil aviation agency
 Istituto Nazionale per le Applicazioni del Calcolo (National Institute for the Application of Calculus, now Istituto per le Applicazioni del Calcolo "Mauro Picone"), Italian scientific institution on applied mathematics
 Instituto Nacional de Cultura, a Panamanian governmental agency
 National Meat Institute (Instituto Nacional de Carnes), a Uruguayan governmental agency
 INAC Kobe Leonessa, Japanese football club
 İnaç, Çankırı